Merantau, released in some countries as Merantau Warrior, is a 2009 Indonesian martial arts action film written, directed and edited by Gareth Huw Evans, and starring Iko Uwais. The film, which marks Uwais' debut as an actor, is the first collaboration between director Evans and star Uwais. It also marks the acting debut of Yayan Ruhian, both of whom Evans met while shooting for a documentary in Indonesia which became his introduction to the Pencak Silat martial art.

The film showcases the Minangkabau tradition of "Merantau", a rite of passage where a man leaves his home to pursue a career or gain experience outside of the village, a culture where inheritance is largely matriarchal. It showcases Yuda who leaves his village in hopes of teaching Silat in Jakarta, only to be sidetracked as he attempts to save a girl from being kidnapped. The film showcases a style of Silat known as "Silek Harimau" (Tiger Silat). It also features actors Donny Alamsyah and Alex Abbad who, along with Uwais and Ruhiyan, would later appear in Evans' subsequent films in The Raid (2011) and The Raid 2 (2014).

Evans' first major feature film, Merantau premiered at the Puchon International Fantastic Film Festival in South Korea on 23 July 2009, before being released theatrically on 6 August in Indonesia. It won the Jury Award for Best Film at the inaugural 2010 ActionFest in North Carolina.

Plot
Yuda is a Minangkabau from West Sumatra and an expert in silat. As part of the merantau (journeying) tradition, he leaves his home to seek a career outside his hometown. He plans to teach silat to the children in Jakarta. On his bus journey, he meets Eric, another Silat expert. When he hears of Yuda's plan, Eric somberly warns him that the city is quite different from what Yuda is used to, and it will be difficult to make a living teaching Silat. (They attend an audition for bodyguards that Eric has heard about. Eric swiftly and decisively defeats his opponent, winning him the job; he asks Yuda to join him, but Yuda, uncomfortable with the situation, declines. - Indonesian version only)

Yuda finds that the address where he was meant to stay has been torn down, leaving him homeless. The next day his wallet is stolen by a kid named Adit; chasing him, Yuda then encounters Adit's sister, Astri, arguing with her boss, Johnny.  When Johnny begins abusing Astri, Yuda saves her, but in retaliation Johnny fires Astri, causing her to vent her frustrations on Yuda. The next day, Yuda sees Astri being beaten by Johnny again. He intervenes again, only to be overpowered by his thugs. He quickly recovers and saves Astri from Johnny, in the process brutally scarring Johnny's boss, Ratger. Ratger's associate, Luc, tries to calm down Ratger, who vows to stay in the city until he hunts down Astri and Yuda.

Yuda takes Astri and Adit to the construction site where he is staying. Yuda explains why he came to the city and talks about his older brother, who used to always beat him up. Astri explains how her parents abandoned her and Adit a few years ago, and how she has been taking care of them ever since. The next day, Astri and Adit decide to retrieve their savings from their home in an apartment complex. Yuda goes alone to retrieve the money, but is attacked by several of Ratger's thugs sent to guard the building; he manages to defeat them all.

Meanwhile, Astri and Adit are seen by several thugs and chased through the streets. Astri helps Adit to hide before she is kidnapped by several henchmen. Yuda manages to defeat the attackers as he finds Adit. He promises Adit that he'll find his sister and tells him to hide as he sets off. Yuda returns to Johnny's club and dispatches his henchmen, before forcing Johnny to tell him where to find Ratger. Yuda makes his way to an apartment building as Ratger takes Astri upstairs to his room, telling a guard to wait downstairs in case Yuda appears. Yuda enters the elevator and starts to ride upwards only for the elevator to stop and the guard to enter. Yuda realizes the guard is Eric, the man he met on the bus, and Yuda tries to convince him he doesn't have to fight. Eric is ashamed of what he has become, but doesn't feel he has any way out, and they brutally fight in the elevator.

Ratger rapes Astri and takes her to the parking garage, leaving two guards to wait for the elevator. Meanwhile, Yuda defeats Eric, but spares him, declaring that they are not the same. The elevator opens and the two guards pull guns; Eric pushes Yuda to safety, before being killed in a hail of bullets. Yuda sees Ratger and Astri in a car as they leave the parking garage and manages to jump onto another car. At a shipping dock, Ratger puts Astri in a storage container with other women. Yuda appears to Ratger and Luc, who decide to test his skills by having their henchmen fight him. Yuda defeats all the thugs before engaging in a brutal two-on-one fight against both Ratger and Luc. Yuda holds his own against the two until Luc and Ratger arm themselves with a crowbar and metal pipe. Yuda eventually slams a container door onto Luc, causing him to impale himself with the crowbar.

Luc's death throws Ratger into a rage, and he viciously attacks Yuda, pinning him to a shipment container. Yuda eventually gains the upper hand and defeats Ratger, but like Eric before, he decides not to kill him. Yuda then opens the container, freeing the women. As Yuda and Astri reunite, Ratger attacks from behind, stabbing Yuda in the stomach. Yuda quickly finishes off Ratger before collapsing. Yuda tells Astri his final wishes before he dies. Astri leaves, returning to her brother's hiding place.  Astri and Adit eventually go to the countryside and live with Yuda's family. The story then ends with Yuda's mother standing in the doorway of the home watching Adit go to school; her perspective changes as she sees Adit as her son, Yuda.

Cast
 Iko Uwais as Yuda
 Sisca Jessica as Astri
 Mads Koudal as Ratger
 Laurent Buson as Luc
 Yusuf Aulia as Adit, Astri's brother
 Alex Abbad as Johni, Astri's pimp
 Yayan Ruhian as Eric
 Christine Hakim as Wulan, Yuda's mother
 Donny Alamsyah as Yayan, Yuda's brother
 Ratna Galih as Ayi

Release
The film premiered at the Puchon International Fantastic Film Festival  in South Korea as the opening film of the closing ceremony on 23 July 2009. It was released theatrically on 6 August 2009 in Indonesia. The film made its US debut at the Austin Fantastic Fest on 24 September 2009, where it was nominated for the Audience Award.

It made its Europe debut at the Sitges Film Festival in Spain on 9 October 2009, and in France at the Festival Mauvais Genre on 3 April 2010. It was screened at the inaugural ActionFest on 17 April 2010, where it won the Jury Award for Best Film. The jury included the likes of Chuck Norris, Drew McWeeny of HitFix,  Todd Brown of TwitchFilm, Devin Faraci of CHUD, and Colin Geddes of TIFF's Midnight Madness.

Critical response
Merantau received generally positive reviews from film critics.

Cole Abaius of Film School Rejects calls the film a "Mind-exploding action sequences coupled with genuine emotional impact."

Harry Knowles of Ain't It Cool opines that the film is "a tremendous martial arts film"; noting it as an "outstanding" film.

Moises Chiullan of Hollywood Elsewhere wrote that the film is "one of the more compelling and powerful martial arts films" he has seen.

Andrew Mack, reviewing for Twitch Film, wrote that the film "is the next great martial arts film to come out and one of the best this past decade."

Todd Brown, on another review for Twitch Film, praises the film by saying that it "serves very loud notice that Indonesia is back in the action game."

Mike Leeder of Impact Magazine expresses his excitement toward the film, saying that it "proves Indonesian action cinema can stand alongside the best of the rest of the world."

Accolades

References

External links
 Official website 
 
 

2009 films
Films directed by Gareth Evans
Films set in Indonesia
Films shot in Indonesia
2000s Indonesian-language films
Indonesian martial arts films
Silat films
2009 martial arts films